Sweetland is a surname. Notable people with the surname include:

 Dale Sweetland (born 1949), American politician
 Doug Sweetland, American animator and film director
 Edwin Sweetland (1875–1950), American football player, coach and academic administrator
 Fred Sweetland (1893–1958), American football player
 George Sweetland (1872–1954), American football player, coach and physician
 Kirsten Sweetland (born 1988), Canadian triathlete
 Les Sweetland (1901–1974), American baseball player
 Monroe Sweetland (1910–2006), American politician
 William H. Sweetland (1856–1932), Justice of the Rhode Island Supreme Court